The University Students' African Revolutionary Front (USARF) was a political student group formed in 1967 at the University of Dar es Salaam in Tanzania. The group, which engaged in study and activism and held regular meetings on Sundays, featured many students who would go on to become influential politicians. USARF was composed of students from Kenya, Zambia, Malawi, Zimbabwe, Ethiopia, Sudan, Tanzania, Uganda and elsewhere in Africa. President of Uganda, Yoweri Museveni was elected its chairman for the whole time he was at university. John Garang, another former USARF member, was the vice-president of Sudan at the time of his death in July 2005. The group identified closely with African liberation movements, especially FRELIMO in Mozambique.

Alumni 
Malawi
Kapote Mwakasungura

Sudan
John Garang

Tanzania
Charles Kileo
Salim Msoma
Adam Marwa
Patrick Quoro
Andrew Shija
Joatham Mwijage Mporogoma Kamala

Uganda
Yoweri Museveni
Eriya Kategaya
James Wapakhabulo
Joseph Mulwanyamuli Ssemwogerere
John Kawangaall

References 

University of Dar es Salaam
Politics of Africa